The All People's Congress is a political party in Ghana formed by a break away from the People's National Convention (PNC).

History
It was founded in 2016 by Hassan Ayariga after leaving the People's National Convention, where he lost out to Edward Mahama as the presidential candidate for the December 2016 general election.  The party's focus for the election campaign was jobs and the economy.

Disqualification
Two months before the 2016 Ghanaian general election however, Charlotte Osei, chairman of the Electoral Commission of Ghana announced that 13 presidential candidates, including Hassan Ayariga, had been disqualified from standing as presidential candidates in the December elections due to problems with the nomination documents they filed with the commission. These included failure to declare his hometown or constituency of residence on his forms as well as two of the subscribers on his forms having been named on another candidates forms which are in contravention of the electoral laws. The forms were also alleged to contain forged signatures and were to be referred to the Ghana Police Service for investigation. The subscriber duplication involved someone who had also signed papers for his former party, the PNC's nominee. Ayariga expressed his frustration at this development, questioning why he was still disqualified when all the names were legal.

Electoral performance

Parliamentary elections

Presidential elections

See also
 List of political parties in Ghana

References

2016 establishments in Ghana
Political parties established in 2016
Political parties in Ghana